Place branding (includes place marketing and place promotion) is a term based on the idea that "cities and regions can be branded," whereby branding techniques and other marketing strategies are applied to "the economic, political and cultural development of cities, regions and countries." As opposed to the branding of products and services, place branding is more multidimensional in nature, as a 'place' is inherently "anchored into a history, a culture, an ecosystem," which is then incorporated into a network of associations, "linking products, spaces, organizations and people."  As such, the concepts of nation branding, region branding, and city branding (also known as urban branding), fall under the umbrella term of place branding.

The practice is understood to have gained significance with the emergence of the post-industrial society among developing nations, in which places contend in an interdependent, increasingly-globalized economy. Thus, place branding invariably relates to the notion that places compete with other places for people, resources, and business, and, as result, many public administrations pursue such strategies. As of 2011, the global competition of cities is estimated to host at least 2.7 million small cities/towns, 3,000 large cities, and 455 metropolises,

In essence, place branding is "a strategy for projecting images and managing perceptions about places". As such, it purposes to induce affective responses from consumers, thereby forming meaningful relationship between person and place.

Origins

Most often associated with capitalistic function, branding has traditionally been understood as a strategy used upon promoting goods and services to evoke emotional response from consumers. Accordingly, place branding follows the notion that places (e.g. cities and urban spaces) can be "shaped and managed just like any other brand." 

The practice of place branding is understood to have emerged in the mid-19th century. The United States, in particular, began such strategies in order to attract rural populations to urban centers for labor. Later, the practice would be used for tourism purpose, especially in Europe, with famous posters of places. However, the practice would not become commonplace among cities and countries until recent years. This emphasis is considered to represent a broader phenomenon that emerged around the 1970s known as urban regeneration, whereby systems of production within developed countries became "vertically disintegrated," giving way to post-industrial societies, typified by "entrepreneurial" forms of governance. Such interest seems to have come out of recognition that "places of all kinds can benefit from implementing coherent strategies with regard to managing their resources, reputation and image."

In Academia 
Though scholarly interest in the domain of place branding is still in its nascent stages, published academic research has seen considerable increase in recent years. As the world economy becomes more and more integrated and interconnected, this interest will only continue to grow, especially as cities compete for "talent attraction, tourism promotion, the hosting of sporting and cultural events, investment attraction, and the many other goals that cities set out to achieve in their quest for urban development and regeneration."

Place branding is an interdisciplinary approach that can be focused in on as a field in sociology (including urban sociology, criminology, and cultural sociology), political science, cultural anthropology, cultural studies, communication studies, marketing, international relations, and others. It may even be applied to other arts and humanities, such as film studies or literature, in so far as observing how places are portrayed or imagined (e.g. Thebes in Oedipus Rex or Gotham City in the Batman franchise).

Impacts of Globalization

One of the tenets of place branding posits that the struggle for attention and preference is not limited to commercial goods and services; it applies equally to geopolitical entities. Countries and cities compete for tourist income, business, and often tax bases. Even within cities, there is a fierce competition between city centers urban vs. suburban areas; big-box retailers vs. local businesses; shopping malls vs. traditional downtowns. Proponents of place branding argue that this heightened competitive environment makes it important for places, no matter their size or composition, to clearly differentiate themselves and to convey why they are relevant and valued options.

This view is supported and defended by Joao Freire, among others, who states that successful destination-brand management can be seen as an exercise of coordination where relevant variables—such as tourism infrastructures, quality of local services, and other destination-brand users need to be managed in order to achieve a coherent and desired destination-brand identity. Thus, contrary to popular conception that destination-brand building is solely an exercise in communication, destination branding is, in reality, an exercise of identification, organization and coordination of all the variables that affect the destination image.

The strategic application of place branding is growing with nations, regions, cities, and institutions as they realize they compete with other places for people, resources, and business. The phenomenon of place branding, as an organic process of image communication without strategy, has been occurring throughout history.

Processes

Place branding is a process made up of several sub-processes. Unlike branding simpler entities like a product, service, company, person or classical subjects of branding, place branding, and in particular nation and city branding, is a complex process. The complexity comes from the great diversity of stakeholders in the process.

In general, a place brand is derived from existing assets of the place such as its value offering or public perception. Otherwise, the place brand is derived from created assets, such as events, policies, abstract concepts of tolerance, and so on.

The derived image of the place brand is then communicated through communication channels. These channels vary and range from television advertisements to Internet marketing efforts. These communications are aimed at a specific target market.

City/Urban Branding 

City branding (also known as urban branding) refers to all the activities that are undergone with the purpose of turning a city from a location into a destination. "Successful branding," says Robert Jones, consultant director at international brand consultancy Wolff Olins, "can turn a city into a place where people want to live, work and visit." City branding is often confused with city marketing. The two differ in the fact that marketing uses consumer wishes and needs as its guiding principle for the operations of an organization, whereas in the case of branding a chosen vision, mission and identity play that role.

City branding creates a single brand for the city and extends it to all its offerings and interactions. From a consumer's point of view, this creates a unique picture of the city at every level of interactions. This also helps in removing the need to present a case by case picture of the city for each of its offerings to the customers.

A city brand is its promise of value, a promise that needs to be kept. Good branding can assist in making cities desirable, just as bad branding can assist in making cities undesirable. Some examples of well-branded cities are New York City, San Francisco and Paris. It is seen that the successful city brands marketed their history, quality of place, lifestyle, culture, diversity, and proactively formed cooperative partnerships between city municipalities and government in order to enhance their infrastructure. Equally important is the role of positioning in the branding process, i.e. creating a distinct place in the market for the city to occupy.

Examples of Urban Branding campaigns

Jerusalem has a clear city brand as a holy city. The holy city includes numerous significant holy sites such as the Western Wall, Church of the Holy Sepulcher, the Garden Tomb, and the Temple Mount. A study commissioned by the Swedish Research Council suggests that Jerusalem may be one of the oldest city brands, having undergone organic branding campaigns for centuries. Pilgrimage, the religious equivalent of tourism, has been part of Jerusalem's history for millennia.

Las Vegas or simply Vegas is used by the Las Vegas Convention and Visitors Authority as a brand to market the bulk of the Las Vegas Valley, including the Las Vegas Strip, Las Vegas, Nevada, Henderson, Nevada, North Las Vegas, Nevada and parts of Clark County, Nevada. The city has also branded itself as "Sin City."

Other examples of urban brands include:

 Amsterdam – "WE Amsterdam"
 Abu Ghosh – "world capital of hummus"
 New York City – "I Love New York"
 Paris – "Illuminated City"
 Seattle "Emerald City"
 Silicon Valley – "tech capital"
 Esfahan - "untold stories"

Notes

References
Brian Lonsway, "The Experience of a Lifestyle," pp. 225–246 in The Themed Space: Locating Culture, Nation, and Self, ed. Scott A. Lukas (Lanham, MD, Lexington Books, 2007), 
How to Brand Nations, Cities and Destinations, Teemu Moilanen & Seppo Rainisto, Palgrave Macmillan (2008).
Nation Branding. Concepts, Issues, Practice. Keith Dinnie, Butterworth Heinemann (2009).

Types of branding
Brand management